Wohlfahrtia smarti is a species of flesh fly in the family Sarcophagidae.

Range
Mauritania.

References

Sarcophagidae
Insects described in 1938